Marine Corps Forces Europe and Africa (abbreviated as MARFOREUR/AF), headquartered in Panzer Kaserne-Barracks in Böblingen, Germany, is the U.S. Marine Corps component of the U.S. European Command and U.S. Africa Command.

History 
In February 1980 the Commandant of the Marine Corps and the Chief of Naval Operations revised the operational task sharing between the two branches in a memorandum. Hitherto the USMC had a supporting role within United States Naval Forces Europe (NAVEUR). When that agreement came into effect on July 1, 1980, Headquarters, Fleet Marine Force Europe, the predecessor of the present unit, was founded in London including an independent 40-person staff as a Designed Component Command, to act as a Command Unit for further formations to be put under EUCOM-Command in case of a crisis situation. That staff immediately began preparing operation plans for optimal replenishment and deployment when required. FMF Europe arranged Marine support for Operation Provide Comfort, Operation Provide Promise, and Operation Deny Flight. To meet increasing challenges better, headquarters were transferred to Böblingen near Stuttgart on November 8, 1993. In February 1994 the headquarters was renamed MARFOREUR.

MARFOREUR is now dual-hatted with Marine Corps Forces Africa as Marine Corps Forces Europe / Africa, since November 2008.

Organization 

Currently, MARFOREUR/AF has a manning level of more than 1,500 Marines, of which about 100 serve at headquarters in Böblingen.

MARFOREUR/AF serves as a headquarters and liaison organization for USMC efforts in the EUCOM area of responsibility. In normal circumstances Marine elements in the theater are few – routinely, the Marine Expeditionary Unit attached to United States Sixth Fleet, and possibly other small units and detachments. Yet the HQ makes it possible to call upon forces from II Marine Expeditionary Force (II MEF), based at Camp Lejeune, North Carolina. This force comprises the 2nd Marine Division, the 2nd Marine Aircraft Wing, and the 2nd Marine Logistics Group, formerly known as the 2nd Force Service Support Group.

II MEF would also supply forces for the Norway Air-Landed Marine Expeditionary Brigade (NALMEB). NALMEB is a remnant NATO Cold War reinforcement organization, and would have come under command of Allied Forces Northern Europe. Significant equipment storage for a MEB is located in northern Norway under the Marine Corps Prepositioning Program-Norway, and administered in the contiguous United States by Blount Island Command. The Norwegian Government has integrated the presence of a MEB into its defense planning.

Yet the tasking is now more theoretical than real, as the last confirmed deployment was Exercise Battle Griffin in 1991, in which the 2nd Marine Expeditionary Brigade, made up from USMCR reserve units due to Operation Desert Storm, made the first test of the concept. The exercise was conducted in February and March 1991 and the Brigade was made up of the 25th Marines regimental headquarters, 3rd Battalion, 25th Marines (infantry), Company E, 4th Reconnaissance Battalion, and 1st Battalion, 14th Marines (artillery).

In 2014 the USMC added heavy armored vehicles to NALMEB for the first time.

As of January 2017, a rotational force of about 330 (infantry) U.S. Marines from Camp Lejeune, NC, are stationed in Trondheim, Norway on two six-month deployments.
 Official MARFOREUR writings say that the Marine Rotational Force, Europe (MRF-E) comprises "an infantry company reinforced by enablers and a Marine Coordination Element. [Their] presence in Norway facilitates military exercises that support NATO and USEUCOM operational plans; increases interoperability with Allies and Partners; advances efforts for more naval integration; and enables recuperation of the Marine Corps' cold weather and mountain proficiencies."

See also 
 Black Sea Rotational Force
 Special Purpose Marine Air-Ground Task Force – Crisis Response – Africa
 Cornell A. Wilson Jr.
Operation Odyssey Dawn

References

External links 

Marine Forces Europe website
MARFOREUR on globalsecurity.org

Military units and formations of the United States Marine Corps
United States military in Germany